Adrian Johnson was a prolific screenwriter during the silent film era. Johnson wrote some of Fox Film's highest grossing films. More than a dozen starred Theda Bara. His screenplay for Cleopatra (1917 film) depicted Antony and Cleopatra's love affair from the perspective of Hamarachi.

He copyrighted and sold an Adrian Johnson Photoplay System that brought "the fascinating profitable profession of screen writing to the very door of the person of average intelligence." The course included 20 lessons and a dictionary of terms. It promised to "make failire impossible."

Filmography
Romeo and Juliet (1916)
The Tiger Woman (1917)
Madame DuBarry (1917)
Cleopatra (1917)
Salomé (1918)
The Soul of Buddha (1918)
The Forbidden Path (1918)
Checkers (1919)
When Men Desire (1919), adaptation of a J. Searle Dawley story

References

American male screenwriters